Roy Orchard Woodruff (March 14, 1876 – February 12, 1953) was a politician, soldier, printer, and dentist from the U.S. state of Michigan.

Woodruff was born of English and Scottish ancestry to Charles Woodruff and Electa A. (Wallace) Woodruff in Eaton Rapids, Michigan. He attended the common schools and the high school of Eaton Rapids, and apprenticed to the printing business from 1891 to 1899. He enlisted as a corporal in Company G, Thirty-third Regiment, Michigan Volunteer Infantry, during the Spanish–American War. He saw active service and was mustered out.

Woodruff graduated from the dental department of the Detroit College of Medicine in 1902 and practiced dentistry in Bay City from 1902 to 1911. On 26 April 1905 he married Vera May Hall, the daughter of Michigan Republican State Central Committee member De Vere Hall. He was mayor of Bay City from 1911 to 1913.

In 1912, Woodruff defeated incumbent Republican U.S. Representative George A. Loud to be elected as the candidate of the Progressive Party from Michigan's 10th congressional district to the 63rd Congress, serving from March 4, 1913, to March 3, 1915. Woodruff and William J. MacDonald (12th district) were the only two Michiganders elected to the U.S. House from the Progressive Party. He was not a candidate for re-nomination in 1914 and served for two years in the First World War as an Infantry officer, acquiring the rank of major during his service in France.

In 1920, Woodruff returned to Congress, elected as a Republican from the same district to the 67th Congress. He was subsequently re-elected to the fifteen succeeding Congresses, serving from March 4, 1921, to January 3, 1953. On June 11, 1921, just three months after returning to office, he married his second wife Daisy E. Fish. He was re-elected unopposed in 1922 and 1926 and was alternate delegate to Republican National Convention from Michigan in 1940. He was not a candidate for re-nomination in 1952 to the 83rd Congress.

Roy O. Woodruff was a Baptist, later Presbyterian and a member of the American Dental Association, American Legion, United Spanish War Veterans, Freemasons, Elks, and Odd Fellows. He died in Washington, D.C., a little over a month after leaving office and a month before his seventy-seventh birthday. He is interred in Elm Lawn Cemetery of Bay City.

References

 The Political Graveyard

External links
 

1876 births
1953 deaths
American dentists
People from Eaton Rapids, Michigan
American people of English descent
American people of Scottish descent
American Presbyterians
Michigan Progressives (1912)
Progressive Party (1912) members of the United States House of Representatives from Michigan
Republican Party members of the United States House of Representatives from Michigan
20th-century American politicians
Wayne State University alumni
American military personnel of the Spanish–American War